C6 tuning is one of the most common tunings for steel guitar, both on single and multiple neck instruments. On a twin-neck, the most common set-up is C6 tuning on the near neck and E9 tuning on the far neck. 

On a six-string neck, for example, on lap steel guitar, C6 tuning is most usually C-E-G-A-C-E, bass to treble and going away from the player. Some other six-string C6 tunings are:
 A-C-E-G-C-E.
 G-C-G-A-C-E.
 E-C-G-A-C-E.
 E-G-A-C-E-G.
 C-A-C-G-C-E

On an eight-string neck, for example, on a console steel guitar, popular C6 tunings are:
 High C6 tuning A-C-E-G-A-C-E-G.
 Low C6 tuning either:
 G-A-C-E-G-A-C-E.
 F-A-C-E-G-A-C-E.

On a ten-string neck, typical of pedal steel guitars, a popular C6 tuning is C-F-A-C-E-G-A-C-E-G, adding two bass strings to the high eight-string tuning, or one string on either side of the F-bass low tuning. This is sometimes called the "Texas tuning". Another frequent variant is the reentrant C-F-A-C-E-G-A-C-E-D.

References

External links 
Steel guitar tunings indexes many tunings.

Steel-guitar tunings